FS Class 214 are small shunting locomotives that are used all across Italy. They were built by a range of manufacturers over a long period. The ALn 668 series of DMUs use the same Fiat engines as the .1000 series locomotives.

References

214
0-4-0 locomotives
Railway locomotives introduced in 1964
214
Shunting locomotives